Sanabo (Arabic: صنبو,  Senouab), also known as Sanbu, is a village in Asyut Governorate, Egypt. In 2006 it had a population of 36,333.

Sanabo is home to the Church of St. George Monastery. According to Coptic church beliefs, The Holy Family traveled to Sanabo.

References

Villages in Egypt
ar:صنبو